Stanley Oscar Gray (December 10, 1888 – October 11, 1964) was a first baseman in Major League Baseball. He played for the Pittsburgh Pirates in 1912.

References

External links

1888 births
1964 deaths
Major League Baseball first basemen
Pittsburgh Pirates players
Baseball players from Texas
Shreveport Pirates (baseball) players
San Antonio Bronchos players
People from Fannin County, Texas
El Paso Mackmen players